Lisa Unger (born April 26, 1970) is an American author of contemporary fiction, primarily psychological thrillers.

Biography
Miscione was born in New Haven, Connecticut but grew up in the Netherlands, England and New Jersey. She spent her teens in the Long Valley section of Washington Township, Morris County, New Jersey. Miscione moved to New York City after high school, where she graduated from the New School for Social Research and spent a decade working in publishing in New York. After a vacation in Florida, where she met her future husband who was vacationing from Detroit, she changed direction. She married Jeff Unger, resigned her job, moved to Florida and gave herself a year to sell her first novel. Fairly quickly she found an agent and sold a deal to produce four crime novels.

Unger published ten books and became an internationally bestselling author with her books being translated into twenty-six languages, with around 2 million sales. Her first four books were published in her maiden name of Lisa Miscione. Her first release as Lisa Unger was Beautiful Lies in 2006. In the Blood won the 2015 Silver Falchion Award for Best Novel (Crime Thriller). and was a Goodreads Choice Awards Nominee for Best Mystery & Thriller 2014.

Novels
Novels
 Beautiful Lies (2006) – Ridley Jones #1
 Sliver of Truth (2007) – Ridley Jones #2
 Black Out (2008) – Standalone
 Die for You (2009) – Standalone
 Fragile (2010) – Jones Cooper #1 (The Hollows book 1)
 Darkness, My Old Friend (2011) – Jones Cooper #2 (The Hollows book 2)
 Heartbroken (2012) – Standalone
 In the Blood (2014) – Standalone (The Hollows book 3)
 Crazy Love You (February 2015) – Standalone (The Hollows book 4)
 Ink and Bone (June 2016) – Jones Cooper #3  (The Hollows book 5)
 The Red Hunter (April 2017) – Standalone
 Under My Skin (Oct. 2018) – Standalone
 The Stranger Inside (Sep 2019) - Standalone
 Confessions on the 7:45 (Sept. 2020) – Standalone
 All My Darkest Impulses (May 2021) – House of Crows #1
 Fog Descending (May 2021) – House of Crows #2
 Circling the Drain (May 2021) – House of Crows #3
 Love the Way You Lie (May 2021) – House of Crows #4
 Last Girl Ghosted (Oct. 2021) – Standalone
 Secluded Cabin Sleeps Six (Nov. 2022) - Standalone

Writing as Lisa Miscione. Re-released in 2011 by Crown Publishing Group:
 Angel Fire (2002) – Lydia Strong #1
 The Darkness Gathers (2003) – Lydia Strong #2
 Twice (2004) – Lydia Strong #3
 Smoke (2005) – Lydia Strong #4

Novellas
 The Whispering Hollows (2016) (The Hollows series)

References

External links
Lisa Unger's website
Lisa Unger on a Comfort Junkie’s Resistance to Adventure Travel (The Wall Street Journal March 2015)
Lisa Unger's Official Wattpad Profile
Interview with Publishers Weekly
Do Some Damage Interview
Interview with ITW's The Big Thrill
Interview with Booklist
Interview with Suicide Girls

1970 births
Living people
21st-century American novelists
American mystery writers
American thriller writers
American women novelists
Women mystery writers
21st-century American women writers
Women thriller writers
People from Washington Township, Morris County, New Jersey